Oak Grove is a historic home located near Manakin-Sabot, Goochland County, Virginia.  The central block of the main dwelling was built about 1850 in the Greek Revival style. It is two stories high and three bays wide, and features a full-width front porch with Doric order-style square columns and engaged pilasters. A semidetached one-story, two-bay wing, was built about 1820, and a two-story, two-bay rear wing was added about 1866.  Also on the property are the contributing one-story heavy timber frame meat house, a one-story frame barn, a brick-and-stone-lined circular well, and the stone foundations of two historic dependencies.

It was listed on the National Register of Historic Places in 2009.

References

Houses on the National Register of Historic Places in Virginia
Greek Revival houses in Virginia
Houses completed in 1866
Houses in Goochland County, Virginia
National Register of Historic Places in Goochland County, Virginia
1866 establishments in Virginia